Harvey James Duke Isted (born 5 March 1997) is an English professional footballer who plays as a goalkeeper for Barnsley, on loan from EFL Championship side Luton Town.

He has also played for Southampton, Stoke City, Chesham United, Oxford City and Wealdstone.

Early and personal life
Isted was born in Chichester, West Sussex and attended Chichester High School For Boys.

Career
Isted joined League Two side Luton Town on 27 July 2017 following his release from Stoke City. He made his debut for the club over a year later in a 2–1 EFL Trophy victory over Brighton & Hove Albion U21.

In September 2019 he moved on loan to National League South club Oxford City for one month, keeping a clean sheet on his debut. In November 2019 he moved on loan to Wealdstone, also in the National League South. Having won promotion to the National League in his first season at the club, he re-joined Wealdstone on loan in September 2020. However, on 30 November 2020, Isted was recalled by Luton following an injury to fellow goalkeeper Simon Sluga. On 30 January 2021, Isted re-joined Wealdstone on loan for a third time.  

Isted made his first appearance for Luton since 2018 in a 3–2 loss to Premier League side Chelsea in the FA Cup on 2 March 2022, coming on as an early substitute for the injured Jed Steer and winning praise for his performance. He made his league debut for Luton on 18 April 2022, almost five years since first joining the club, again coming on as a substitute after an injury to James Shea in a 1–0 Championship victory over Cardiff City. Five days later, Isted made his first start of the season and his first league start in a Luton shirt in the 1–1 home draw against Blackpool.

He moved on loan to Barnsley in January 2023.

Career statistics

References

1997 births
Living people
Sportspeople from Chichester
Footballers from West Sussex
English footballers
Association football goalkeepers
Southampton F.C. players
Stoke City F.C. players
Luton Town F.C. players
Chesham United F.C. players
Oxford City F.C. players
Wealdstone F.C. players
Southern Football League players
English Football League players
Barnsley F.C. players